Cambridge Arms is a historic building in Columbus, Ohio. It was listed as part of the E. Broad St. Multiple Resources Area on the National Register of Historic Places in 1986, removed in 1987 due to owner objection, and re-added in 2003. The building is part of the 18th & E. Broad Historic District on the Columbus Register of Historic Properties, added to the register in 1988.

See also
 National Register of Historic Places listings in Columbus, Ohio

References

Commercial buildings completed in 1928
Commercial buildings on the National Register of Historic Places in Ohio
1928 establishments in Ohio
Apartment buildings in Ohio
National Register of Historic Places in Columbus, Ohio
Columbus Register properties
King-Lincoln Bronzeville
Broad Street (Columbus, Ohio)